Novak Djokovic and Jonathan Erlich were the defending champions, but Djokovic decided not to compete, and Erlich chose to play at Halle instead.

Bob Bryan and Mike Bryan won the title, defeating Mahesh Bhupathi and Leander Paes 6–7(2–7), 7–6(7–4), [10–6] in the final.

Seeds
All seeds received a bye into the second round.

Draw

Finals

Top half

Bottom half

References

2011 Aegon Championships